James Thomas Turner (born March 12, 1938) is a senior judge of the United States Claims Court (now named the United States Court of Federal Claims).

Education and career

Turner received his Bachelor of Arts from Wake Forest College in 1960 and his Bachelor of Laws from the University of Virginia School of Law in 1965.

In 1960 he was a desk reporter and copy desk employee for the Winston-Salem Journal in Winston-Salem, North Carolina. In 1963 he was general laborer and clerical worker for a construction company in Charlottesville, Virginia. From 1963 to 1965 he was a legal assistant for the law firm of Deets and Martin in Charlottesville, Virginia.

He was formerly in the private practice of law in Norfolk, Virginia, 1965–1979 with the firm Williams, Worrell, Kelly & Greer. He served in the United States Army from 1960 to 1962, achieving the rank of captain.

Federal judicial service

District Court service
Turner was appointed a United States magistrate judge for the Eastern District of Virginia in July 1979 and served in that position until his appointment as Judge of the United States Court of Federal Claims.

Court of Federal Claims service
On April 23, 1987, he was nominated by President Reagan to a seat on the Court of Claims vacated by Haldane Robert Mayer who was elevated to the Federal Circuit. On June 3, 1987, a hearing was held on his nomination. He was reported out of committee on June 23, 1987. On July 1, 1987, he was confirmed in the United States Senate by voice vote. He was appointed Judge to the United States Court of Federal Claims on July 2, 1987, and entered on duty on August 19, 1987. He became a senior judge on July 2, 2002.

Personal life

He is married to the former Patricia Renfrow and has one son, James, III.

Memberships
He is a member of the American Bar Association, Virginia Bar Association, Virginia State Bar, and Norfolk and Portsmouth Bar Association.

References

External links

Living people
1938 births
20th-century American judges
20th-century American lawyers
21st-century American judges
Judges of the United States Court of Federal Claims
People from Clifton Forge, Virginia
United States Army officers
United States magistrate judges
University of Virginia School of Law alumni
Virginia lawyers
Wake Forest University alumni
United States Article I federal judges appointed by Ronald Reagan